Social Democrats is a name used by a number of political parties in various countries around the world. Such parties are most commonly aligned to social democracy.

Social Democrats may refer to:

 Social Democrats (Croatia), a social-democratic political party in Croatia
 Social Democrats (Denmark), a social-democratic political party in Denmark
 Social Democrats (Germany), a social-democratic political party in Germany
 Social Democrats (Ireland), a centre-left political party in Ireland
 Social Democrats (Italy), a centre-left political party in Italy
 Social Democrats (Slovenia), a centre-left political party in Slovenia
 Social Democrats (Sweden), a social-democratic political party in Sweden
 Social Democrats, USA, a small association of democratic socialists and social democrats in the United States
 Social Democrats of Uganda, a political party in Uganda
 Åland Social Democrats, a social-democratic political party on the Åland Islands
 Gibraltar Social Democrats, a liberal-conservative, centre-right political party in Gibraltar
 Portuguese Social Democrats, a liberal-conservative political party in Portugal
 Social Democrats of Montenegro, a centre-left political party in Montenegro
 Supporters of social democracy in general
 Various parties using the name Social Democratic Party

See also
 
 List of social democratic parties, parties that consider themselves to uphold social democracy
 Social Democracy (disambiguation)
 Social-Demokraten (disambiguation)